Judba (Urdu and ) is the district headquarters of Torghar District, Khyber Pakhtunkhwa, Pakistan.

References

Populated places in Torghar District